Nadj is a surname. It may be a transliteration variant the Hungarian surname Nagy and some other surnames derived from "Nagy" in other languages (Nađ,  Nad, etc.).

Notable people with this surname include:

Alexander Nadj,  Swedish footballer 
Melinda Nadj Abonji, Hungarian-Swiss writer, musician, and performance artist.
, dancer and choreographer